Jo Grainger is a retired American lightweight rower. She won a gold medal at the 1984 World Rowing Championships in Montreal, Canada, with the lightweight women's eight; this was the only year that this boat class competed at World Rowing Championships.

References

Year of birth missing (living people)
Living people
American female rowers
World Rowing Championships medalists for the United States
21st-century American women